Edvard Hannula (23 March 1859 in Nakkila – 11 March 1931) was a Finnish Lutheran clergyman and politician. He was a member of the Diet of Finland in 1897, 1899, 1900, 1904–1905 and 1905–1906 and of the Parliament of Finland from 1909 to 1913 and from 1919 to 1922. He belonged to the Young Finnish Party until 1918 and to the National Coalition Party thereafter.

References

1859 births
1931 deaths
People from Nakkila
People from Turku and Pori Province (Grand Duchy of Finland)
20th-century Finnish Lutheran clergy
Young Finnish Party politicians
National Coalition Party politicians
Members of the Diet of Finland
Members of the Parliament of Finland (1909–10)
Members of the Parliament of Finland (1910–11)
Members of the Parliament of Finland (1911–13)
Members of the Parliament of Finland (1919–22)
University of Helsinki alumni
19th-century Finnish Lutheran clergy